Yaroslav Vazhynskyi (born 23 March 1994 in Ukraine) is a Ukrainian football goalkeeper who plays for FC Alians Lypova Dolyna in the Ukrainian Second League.

Career
Vazhynskyi played one match for the Ukrainian national youth football squad. He was called up as a member of the Ukraine national under-17 football team by coach Yuriy Moroz in February 2011, and played one game.

In February 2016 he signed a one-year contract with the Ukrainian First League's FC Illichivets Mariupol.

References

External links 

1994 births
Living people
Ukrainian footballers
FC Shakhtar-3 Donetsk players
FC Mariupol players
PFC Sumy players
FC Illichivets-2 Mariupol players
MFC Mykolaiv players
Association football goalkeepers
FC Zhemchuzhyna Odesa players
FC Alians Lypova Dolyna players
Ukrainian First League players
Ukrainian Second League players
Ukrainian Amateur Football Championship players